"Late To Da Party (F*CK BET)" is a single by American rappers Lil Nas X and YoungBoy Never Broke Again. It was released as a single through Columbia Records on June 24, 2022. Lil Nas X and YoungBoy wrote the song with producers Take a Daytrip (David Biral and Denzel Baptiste) and Cheese.

Background
After Lil Nas X received no nominations at the BET Awards 2022, he took to Twitter to explain that he felt he was overlooked due to a "bigger problem of homophobia in the black community" and then previewed a track containing the repeated phrase "fuck BET". The phrase appeared in censored form on the original version of the single's artwork, which was later replaced by an image of a man urinating on a BET Award placed in a toilet.

Release and promotion
Lil Nas X promoted the song by announcing humorous fake brand collaborations with Grindr, McDonald's and the "homophobic dog" meme, among others, offering numerous "free" benefits if one pre-saved the song. On June 24, 2022, "Late To Da Party" was released on all main streaming platforms. On the same day, Lil Nas X uploaded the song's music video on YouTube.

Charts

Release history

References

2022 singles
2022 songs
Lil Nas X songs
Songs written by Lil Nas X
YoungBoy Never Broke Again songs
Songs written by YoungBoy Never Broke Again
Song recordings produced by Take a Daytrip